Carsten Lund (born July 1, 1963) is a Danish-born theoretical computer scientist, currently working at AT&T Labs in Bedminster, New Jersey, United States.

Lund was born in Aarhus, Denmark, and received the
"kandidat" degree in 1988 from the University of Aarhus and his Ph.D.
from the University of Chicago in computer science. His thesis, entitled The
Power of Interaction, was chosen as an ACM 'Distinguished Dissertation'.

Lund was a co-author on two of five competing papers at the 1990 Symposium on Foundations of Computer Science characterizing complexity classes such as PSPACE and NEXPTIME in terms of interactive proof systems;
this work became part of his 1991 Ph.D. thesis from the University of Chicago under the supervision of Lance Fortnow and László Babai, for which he was a runner-up for the 1991 ACM Doctoral Dissertation Award.

He is also known for his joint work with Sanjeev Arora, Madhu Sudan, Rajeev Motwani, and Mario Szegedy that discovered the existence of probabilistically checkable proofs for NP-hard problems and used them to prove hardness results for approximation problems; in 2001 he and his co-authors received the Gödel Prize for their share in these discoveries.

More recently he has published highly cited work on internet traffic engineering.

He has been working for AT&T Laboratories since August 1991.

References

External links
AT&T Labs Homepage

1963 births
Living people
Theoretical computer scientists
Scientists at Bell Labs
Aarhus University alumni
People from New Jersey
Gödel Prize laureates
Danish computer scientists